William James Harold Briggs (26 May 1870 – 6 May 1945) was a Conservative Party politician in the United Kingdom who served as Member of Parliament (MP) for Manchester Blackley from 1918 to 1923, and from 1924, until his defeat at the 1929 general election.

References 
 

1870 births
1945 deaths
Conservative Party (UK) MPs for English constituencies
UK MPs 1918–1922
UK MPs 1922–1923
UK MPs 1924–1929
People educated at Stubbington House School